Syke is a town in the district of Diepholz, Lower Saxony, Germany. It is situated approximately 20 km south of Bremen.

Population

 1961: 16,203
 1970: 17,013
 1979: 19,413
 1987: 18,796
 1992: 21,411
 1997: 23,340 
 2002: 23,786
 2007: 24,527
 2011: 24,279
 2013: 23,666

Mayors
2001–2013: Harald Behrens (FDP)
since 2013: Suse Laue (SPD)

Suse Laue won the election in 2013 with 54.3% of the vote against three competitors.

Notable people

 Andreas Frömberg (born 1954), sculptor
 Gabriele Ullrich (born 1960), author

Other personalities 

 Rudi Carrell (1934–2006), Dutch game show host and entertainer; lived 1981–2006 in the district of Wachendorf
 Reinhold Beckmann (born 1956), TV-conductor and football commentator, made his Abitur in Syke
 Baba Saad (born 1985), rapper, lived in Syke from 1994 onwards
 Timo Perthel (born 1989), footballer, played in his youth for the TuS Syke

References

Diepholz (district)